The Big Bounce is a hypothesized cosmological model for the origin of the known universe. It was originally suggested as a phase of the cyclic model or oscillatory universe interpretation of the Big Bang, where the first cosmological event was the result of the collapse of a previous universe. It receded from serious consideration in the early 1980s after inflation theory emerged as a solution to the horizon problem, which had arisen from advances in observations revealing the large-scale structure of the universe. In the early 2000s, inflation was found by some theorists to be problematic and unfalsifiable in that its various parameters could be adjusted to fit any observations, so that the properties of the observable universe are a matter of chance. Alternative pictures including a Big Bounce may provide a predictive and falsifiable possible solution to the horizon problem, and are under active investigation as of 2017.

Expansion and contraction 

The concept of the Big Bounce envisions the Big Bang as the beginning of a period of expansion that followed a period of contraction. In this view, one could talk of a Big Crunch followed by a Big Bang, or more simply, a Big Bounce. This suggests that we could be living at any point in an infinite sequence of universes, or conversely the current universe could be the very first iteration. However, if the condition of the interval phase "between bounces", considered the 'hypothesis of the primeval atom', is taken into full contingency such enumeration may be meaningless because that condition could represent a singularity in time at each instance, if such perpetual return was absolute and undifferentiated.

The main idea behind the quantum theory of a Big Bounce is that, as density approaches infinity, the behavior of the quantum foam changes. All the so-called fundamental physical constants, including the speed of light in vacuum, need not remain constant during a Big Crunch, especially in the time interval smaller than that in which measurement may never be possible (one unit of Planck time, roughly 10−43 seconds) spanning or bracketing the point of inflection.

History 
Big bounce models were endorsed on largely aesthetic grounds by cosmologists including Willem de Sitter, Carl Friedrich von Weizsäcker, George McVittie and George Gamow (who stressed that "from the physical point of view we must forget entirely about the precollapse period").

By the early 1980s, the advancing precision and scope of observational cosmology had revealed that the large-scale structure of the universe is flat, homogenous and isotropic, a finding later accepted as the Cosmological Principle to apply at scales beyond roughly 300 million light-years. It was recognized that it was necessary to find an explanation for how distant regions of the universe could have essentially identical properties without ever having been in light-like communication. A solution was proposed to be a period of exponential expansion of space in the early universe, as a basis for what became known as Inflation theory. Following the brief inflationary period, the universe continues to expand, but at a less rapid rate.

Various formulations of inflation theory and their detailed implications became the subject of intense theoretical study. In the absence of a compelling alternative, inflation became the leading solution to the horizon problem. In the early 2000s, inflation was found by some theorists to be problematic and unfalsifiable in that its various parameters could be adjusted to fit any observations, a situation known as a fine-tuning problem.  Furthermore, inflation was found to be inevitably eternal, creating an infinity of different universes with typically different properties, so that the properties of the observable universe are a matter of chance. An alternative concept including a Big Bounce was conceived as a predictive and falsifiable possible solution to the horizon problem, and is under active investigation as of 2017.

The phrase "Big Bounce" appeared in the scientific literature in 1987, when it was first used in the title of a pair of articles (in German) in Stern und Weltraum by Wolfgang Priester and Hans-Joachim Blome. It reappeared in 1988 in Iosif Rozental's Big Bang, Big Bounce, a revised English-language translation of a Russian-language book (by a different title), and in a 1991 article (in English) by Priester and Blome in Astronomy and Astrophysics. (The phrase apparently originated as the title of a novel by Elmore Leonard in 1969, shortly after increased public awareness of the Big Bang model with of the discovery of the cosmic microwave background by Penzias and Wilson in 1965.)

The idea of existence of a big bounce in the very early universe has found a diverse support in works based on loop quantum gravity. In loop quantum cosmology, a branch of loop quantum gravity, big bounce was first discovered in February 2006, for isotropic and homogeneous models by Abhay Ashtekar, Tomasz Pawlowski and Parampreet Singh at Pennsylvania State University. This result has been generalized to various other models by different groups, and includes the case of spatial curvature, cosmological constant, anisotropies and Fock quantized inhomogenities.

Martin Bojowald, an assistant professor of physics at Pennsylvania State University, published a study in July 2007 detailing work somewhat related to loop quantum gravity that claimed to mathematically solve the time before the Big Bang, which would give new weight to the oscillatory universe and Big Bounce theories.

One of the main problems with the Big Bang theory is that at the moment of the Big Bang, there is a singularity of zero volume and infinite energy. This is normally interpreted as the end of the physics as we know it; in this case, of the theory of general relativity. This is why one expects quantum effects to become important and avoid the singularity.

However, research in loop quantum cosmology purported to show that a previously existing universe collapsed, not to the point of singularity, but to a point before that where the quantum effects of gravity become so strongly repulsive that the universe rebounds back out, forming a new branch. Throughout this collapse and bounce, the evolution is unitary.

Bojowald also claims that some properties of the universe that collapsed to form ours can also be determined. Some properties of the prior universe are not determinable however due to some kind of uncertainty principle. This result has been disputed by different groups which show that due to restrictions on fluctuations stemming from the uncertainty principle, there are strong constraints on the change in relative fluctuations across the bounce.

While the existence of big bounce is still to be demonstrated from loop quantum gravity, robustness of its main features has been confirmed using exact results  and several studies involving numerical simulations using high performance computing in loop quantum cosmology.

In 2006, it was proposed that the application of loop quantum gravity techniques to Big Bang cosmology can lead to a bounce that need not be cyclic.

In 2010, Roger Penrose advanced a general relativity based theory which he calls the "conformal cyclic cosmology”.  The theory explains that the universe will expand until all matter decays and is ultimately turned to light. Since nothing in the universe would have any time or distance scale associated with it, it becomes identical with the Big Bang, in turn resulting in a type of Big Crunch which becomes the next big bang, thus perpetuating the next cycle.

In 2011, Nikodem Popławski showed that a nonsingular Big Bounce appears naturally in the Einstein-Cartan-Sciama-Kibble theory of gravity.
This theory extends general relativity by removing a constraint of the symmetry of the affine connection and regarding its antisymmetric part, the torsion tensor, as a dynamical variable. The minimal coupling between torsion and Dirac spinors generates a spin-spin interaction which is significant in fermionic matter at extremely high densities. Such an interaction averts the unphysical Big Bang singularity, replacing it with a cusp-like bounce at a finite minimum scale factor, before which the universe was contracting. This scenario also explains why the present Universe at largest scales appears spatially flat, homogeneous and isotropic, providing a physical alternative to cosmic inflation.

In 2012, a new theory of nonsingular big bounce was successfully constructed within the frame of standard Einstein gravity. 
This theory combines the benefits of matter bounce and Ekpyrotic cosmology. Particularly, the famous BKL instability, that the homogeneous and isotropic background cosmological solution is unstable to the growth of anisotropic stress, is resolved in this theory. Moreover, curvature perturbations seeded in matter contraction are able to form a nearly scale-invariant primordial power spectrum and thus provides a consistent mechanism to explain the cosmic microwave background (CMB) observations.

A few sources argue that distant supermassive black holes whose large size is hard to explain so soon after the Big Bang, such as ULAS J1342+0928, may be evidence for a Big Bounce, with these supermassive black holes being formed before the Big Bounce.

See also

References

Further reading
 Angha, Nader (2001). Expansion & Contraction Within Being (Dahm). Riverside, CA: M.T.O Shahmaghsoudi Publications. .
 
 
 Taiebyzadeh, Payam (2017). String Theory; A unified theory and inner dimension of elementary particles (BazDahm).  Riverside, Iran: Shamloo Publications Center. .

External links
 
 
 Penn State Researchers Look Beyond The Birth Of The Universe (Penn State) May 12, 2006
 What Happened Before the Big Bang? (Penn State) July 1, 2007
 From big bang to big bounce (Penn State) NewScientist December 13, 2008
 

Physical cosmology
Ultimate fate of the universe